Jamie Patrick Shea  (born 11 September 1953 in London) is a retired member of NATO. He was Deputy Assistant Secretary General for Emerging Security Challenges at NATO Headquarters in Brussels, Belgium until his retirement in late September 2018.
 
He received worldwide attention during the 1999 Kosovo War, when he served as the spokesperson for NATO. He described the children and adult civilians killed by the NATO bombing of Serbia in the effort to prevent the Serbs from retaining Kosovo as the "cost to defeat an evil".

He received his B.A. (Hons.) in Modern History and French from the University of Sussex (1977) and his D.Phil. in Modern History from Lincoln College, Oxford (1981).

Shea was appointed Companion of the Order of St Michael and St George (CMG) in the 2020 New Year Honours for services to diplomacy and public service.

Shea is married and has two children, Chiara and Alexander.

Positions within NATO
 October 2010 – September 2018
Deputy Assistant Secretary General for Emerging Security Challenges
 August 2005 – October 2010
Director of Policy Planning
 April 2003 – August 2005
Deputy Assistant Secretary General for External Relations, Public Diplomacy Division
 October 2000 – March 2003
Director of Information and Press
 1993–2000
Spokesman of NATO and Deputy Director of Information and Press.
 1991–1993
Deputy Head and Senior Planning Officer, Policy Planning Unit and Multilateral Affairs Section of the Political Directorate, NATO.
Speechwriter to the Secretary General of NATO.
 1988–1991
Assistant to the Secretary General of NATO for Special Projects.
 1985–1988
Head of External Relations Conferences and Seminars.
 1982–1985
Head of Youth Programmes.
 1980–1982
Administrator in Council Operations Section of Executive Secretariat.

Academic positions
 As of 2006 (start dates unknown)
Professor, College of Europe, Brugge
Lecturer, Brussels School of International Studies, University of Kent.
 1993 onward
Lecturer in the European Studies Program of the University of Antwerp.
 1991 onward
Course instructor, Boston University, Massachusetts.
 1988 onward
Member of the Advisory Council, International Relations Studies and Programme of Université Libre de Bruxelles.
 1987–1990
Lecturer in Defence Studies, University of Lille.
 1987 onward
Adjunct Associate Professor of International Relations, James Madison College, Michigan State University.
Director of the Michigan State University Summer School in Brussels.
 1985 onward
Associate Professor of International Relations, American University, Washington, D.C.
 2014 onward
Honorary Fellow of the Security and Strategy Institute, University of Exeter, United Kingdom.
 2020 onward
President of the Center for War Studies, University of Southern Denmark.

References

External links

1953 births
Living people
People from London
People educated at Sir George Monoux College
Alumni of the University of Sussex
Alumni of Lincoln College, Oxford
American University faculty and staff
Public relations theorists
NATO officials
Companions of the Order of St Michael and St George